
Gmina Dragacz is a rural gmina (administrative district) in Świecie County, Kuyavian-Pomeranian Voivodeship, in north-central Poland.

Villages
Gmina Dragacz contains the villages and settlements of Bratwin, Dolna Grupa, Dragacz, Fletnowo, Górna Grupa, Grupa, Grupa-Osiedle, Michale, Mniszek, Nowe Marzy, Stare Marzy, Wielki Lubień, Wielkie Stwolno and Wielkie Zajączkowo.

Neighbouring gminas
Gmina Dragacz is bordered by the city of Grudziądz and by the gminas of Chełmno, Grudziądz, Jeżewo, Nowe, Świecie and Warlubie.

References
Polish official population figures 2006

Dragacz
Świecie County